Vivian Nneka O. Oparah (born 30 December 1996) is a British actress and musician. She is known for her work in theatre, earning an Off West End Award nomination, and her roles in the BBC Three Doctor Who spin-off Class (2016) and the film Rye Lane (2023).

Early life
Oparah was born in Camden and grew up in Tottenham, London. She attended The Latymer School, where she took A Levels in media, English literature, product design and biology. During her media coursework in 2014, she formed a band called NTLS along with other students. Their debut single and video Heart Skipped a Beat was published on YouTube. Her older brother also works in music. Oparah joined the National Youth Theatre, where she did a two-week summer course.

Career
While deferring her acceptance to UCL, Oparah was cast in the BBC Three Doctor Who spin-off Class as Tanya Adeola, marking her television debut. Oparah later said that Class was her first audition. When she auditioned she only knew that the series was linked to the Doctor Who universe, but she did not imagine that it was such a big production until she got the job and started filming. During the production of the series Oparah lived in Cardiff, in the same building as actress Sophie Hopkins.

Oparah named an Emerging Talent at the 2017 Screen Nation Film and Television Awards. That same year, she starred as Minnie in the play An Octoroon at the Orange Tree Theatre in Richmond. For her performance, she was nominated for Best Supporting Female in a Play at Off West End Theatre Awards. In 2018, Oparah reprised her role as Tanya in six audio plays by Big Finish and made her feature film debut in Teen Spirit.

In 2020, Oparah appeared in an episode of the BBC One miniseries I May Destroy You as well as the second series of the BBC Three comedy-drama Enterprice. She starred opposite David Jonsson in the romantic comedy Rye Lane, which opened at the 2023 Sundance Film Festival to critical acclaim. She has an upcoming role in the Sky Max drama Then You Run.

Filmography

Film

TV series

Audio
 Class (2018), Tanya Adeola (3 episodes)

Stage

Awards and nominations

References

External links
 
 Vivian Oparah at Independent Talent
 

Living people
1998 births
Actresses from London
Black British actresses
English people of Nigerian descent
National Youth Theatre members
People educated at The Latymer School
People from Tottenham